Mahndorfer See is a lake in Bremen, Germany.

See also
Stadtwaldsee (Bremen)
Kuhgrabensee

Lakes of Bremen